Florian Opahle (born 1983) is a German guitarist, best known for his work with progressive rock musician Ian Anderson and later his band, Jethro Tull. He played with Anderson from 2003 to 2019 and with a reformed Jethro Tull from 2017 to 2019 as lead guitarist with both.

Early career 
Opahle grew up in Rosenheim, Bavaria. He started learning classical guitar at the age of five, and was later trained on the electric guitar. In 2001 and 2002, he attended master classes with Masayuki Kato, in 2002 he passed his high school diploma.

Career 
In 2003 he started working with Ian Anderson and Jethro Tull. He appeared in Europe, North and South America and Asia on and played with musicians such as Al di Meola, Greg Lake and Leslie Mandoki. He accompanied the singer Masha on her Germany tour. From 2007 to 2008 he studied music arrangement and composition at the German Pop Academy.

Opahle took part in several tours with Anderson instead of longtime Jethro Tull guitarist Martin Barre, including on projects in which pieces by Jethro Tull were played with orchestral accompaniment. With Anderson and other musicians, he recorded the albums Thick as a Brick 2 (2012) and Homo Erraticus (2014). From 2017, Anderson toured under the name of Jethro Tull with his regular backing musicians.

Opahle is also active as a studio musician and producer, among others for Alexandra Stan. At times he devotes himself to flamenco music.

Opahle also performed live with former King Crimson and ELP member Greg Lake, which resulted in him appearing on his 2006 album, Live.

Since 2017, he has been running a professional recording studio with his wife called RedBoxx Studios in the south of Germany.

Discography 
With Ian Anderson/Jethro Tull
 Ian Anderson Plays the Orchestral Jethro Tull (2005)
 Thick as a Brick 2 (2012)
 Homo Erraticus (2014)
 Thick as a Brick – Live in Iceland (2014)
 The Zealot Gene by Jethro Tull (2022)

References

External links 

 Official website
 Opahle on Jethro Tull official website

German guitarists
German rock guitarists
German male guitarists
Lead guitarists
Jethro Tull (band) members
People from Rosenheim
1983 births
Living people
Folk rock musicians